Sheldon Thompson (1785–1851) was mayor of Buffalo, New York, serving in 1840–1841. He was born in Derby, Connecticut on July 2, 1785.  In early 1810, he moved to Lewiston, New York where he entered into the shipbuilding business and mercantile trade along the Great Lakes with Senior Partner, Jacob Townsend and Alvin Bronson.. He also entered the salt trade from the Onondaga salt mines. In April 1811, he married Catharine Barton. His daughter Sally Ann married Henry K. Smith a future mayor of the city.  Around 1816 or 1817, Thompson moved to Black Rock, and promoted the village which was in direct competition with Buffalo for the western terminus of the Erie Canal.  By 1830, Thompson moved to Buffalo and became a principal freight forwarder. 

On March 8, 1840, Sheldon Thompson became the first mayor elected by the people.  In 1845, he retired from active business life and occupied himself with the management of his estate. He died in Buffalo on March 13, 1851, and is buried in Forest Lawn Cemetery.

References

1785 births
1851 deaths
Mayors of Buffalo, New York
Burials at Forest Lawn Cemetery (Buffalo)
New York (state) Whigs
19th-century American politicians
People from Lewiston, New York